The Pirates of the Caribbean Trading Card Game is an out-of-print collectible card game based on the two Disney films Pirates of the Caribbean: The Curse of the Black Pearl and Pirates of the Caribbean: Dead Man's Chest.  Upper Deck Entertainment launched this title in June 2006 to roughly correspond to the release of the second film but canceled due to lack of interest.

Game overview
Players fight in one-on-one battles between characters from the movies.  For example, one player might take on the role of Will Turner, while another might play as Jack Sparrow.  Although there is relatively little explanation given for why any two given characters might be fighting, it can be assumed that the contest is over women, riches, or ships of the sea.

The objective of the game is to be the first to score three points.  A point can be earned when opponents are unable to stop an incoming attack after it has penetrated through all three of their colored zones.

Game system
Pirates of the Caribbean is the third game title to make use of the QuickStrike system.  Hence, this game follows the same rules as other games using the same game system, and the cards can effectively be used interchangeably. The Shaman King Trading Card Game was the first game to make use of the QuickStrike system, with Avatar: The Last Airbender Trading Card Game being the second.

Further details about the gaming system and mechanics are described in the QuickStrike article.

Products
The 235-card set, titled Dead Man's Chest, features both starter sets and booster packs.  The two-player starter set includes 62 cards (60 random normal cards and 2 Chamber cards), a rule book, a pair of playmats, and a plastic carrying case.  The cards are split up into two 30 card decks so that two people can play, but can be combined to form one sixty card deck. However, because the cards are random, it is almost certain that such a deck would not be "tournament legal," as described in the rulebook's deck-building rules.

Booster packs contain 10 cards, typically distributed as 5 commons, 3 uncommons, 1 rare, and 1 Chamber card.  Special foil "gold doubloon" cards appear in some boosters.

All Dead Man's Chest cards can be identified by the code PDC (Pirates Dead Man's Chest), which appears immediately before the number on each card.

External links
Pirates of the Caribbean Trading Card Game Website

Pojo's PotC TCG Forum

Card games introduced in 2006
Collectible card games
Pirates of the Caribbean
Upper Deck Company games